Saint Cyril may refer to:

People 
 Cyril of Jerusalem (–386), Christian theologian
 Cyril of Alexandria (–444), Patriarch of Alexandria
 Saint Cyril the Philosopher (826–869), Christian theologian and missionary, credited with devising the Glagolitic alphabet
 Pope Cyril II of Alexandria (1078–1092), Patriarch of Alexandria
 Kirill of Turov (1130–1182), Christian theologian and bishop
 Pope Cyril V of Alexandria (1874–1927), Patriarch of Alexandria
 Pope Cyril VI of Alexandria (1902–1971), Patriarch of Alexandria

See also 
 Cyril (disambiguation)
 Saints Cyril and Methodius (disambiguation)
 St. Cyril's Monastery (disambiguation)

Cyril